Hot 107-9 may refer to:

WHTA-FM, near Atlanta, Georgia
WWHT, Syracuse, New York
WJFX, Fort Wayne, Indiana
KHXT, Lafayette, Louisiana
WPHI, Pennsauken, New Jersey
WPFM, Panama City, Florida